Koundé is a village in the commune of Dir in the Adamawa Region of Cameroon.

Population 
In 1967, Koundé contained 255 inhabitants, mostly Gbaya people

At the time of the 2005 census, there were 753 people in the village.

References

Bibliography
 Jean Boutrais, Peuples et cultures de l'Adamaoua (Cameroun) : actes du colloque de Ngaoundéré du 14 au 16 janvier 1992, Éd. de l'ORSTOM, Paris, 1993
 Philip Burnham, Opportunity and constraint in a savanna society : the Gbaya people of Meiganga, Cameroon, Academic Press, London, New York, 1980, 324 p. 
 Dictionnaire des villages de l'Adamaoua, ONAREST, Yaoundé, October 1974, 133 p.

External links
 Dir, on the website Communes et villes unies du Cameroun (CVUC)

Populated places in Adamawa Region